Green Road may refer to:
 Green Road, Kentucky, an unincorporated community within Knox County, Kentucky
 Green Road railway station, a request stop on the Cumbrian Coast Line in north-western England
 SMK Green Road, a public English-medium secondary school in Kuching, Sarawak, Malaysia
 The Green Road (Enright novel), a 2015 novel by Irish author Anne Enright
 Green Road (RTA Rapid Transit station)

See also
 Green Lane (disambiguation)
 Green Lanes (disambiguation)
 Green Street (disambiguation)